Roseferns (born Antonio Rosario Fernandes; 21 September 1954) is an Indian actor and director who is a Konkani tiatrist. He popularly goes under the sobriquet King of centuries.

Roseferns wrote his first tiatr 'Bolidan' (sacrifice) in 1972, while still a student for a school function. Roseferns Tiatr 'Thapott' (slap) is his best production till date with 230 shows.

References

Tiatrists
Singers from Goa
Living people
Konkani-language singers
1954 births